The Broxbourne Council election, 1980 was held to elect council members of the Broxbourne Borough Council, the local government authority of the borough of Broxbourne,  Hertfordshire, England.

Composition of expiring seats before election

Election results

Results summary 

An election was held in 14 wards on 1 May 1980.

The Conservative Party lost 3 seats at this election. The Labour Party gained 2 seats in Bury Green Ward and Rye Park Ward and the Liberal Party won its first seat at a Broxbourne Borough election by taking Hoddesdon Town Ward.

The new political balance of the council following this election was:

Conservative 34 seats
Labour 7 seats
Liberal 1 seat

Ward results

References

1980
1980 English local elections
1980s in Hertfordshire